Wyoming Highway 134 (WYO 134) is a  east–west Wyoming State Road in northern Fremont County.

Route description
Wyoming Highway 134 begins at Wyoming Highway 133 (Pavillion Road) just south of Pavillion. WYO 134, named Missouri Valley Road, travels eastward through the northern part of the county, passing north of Ocean Lake and the Ocean Lake Wildlife Habitat Management Area At just over 24 miles, Highway 134 reaches its eastern end at US Route 26/Wyoming Highway 789 southwest of Shoshoni and the Boysen Reservoir. 

Wyoming Highway 133 and Highway 134 provide a shorter alternate around US 26 and Riverton saving approximately six miles.

Major intersections

References

External links 

Wyoming State Routes 100-199
WYO 134 - WYO 133 US-26/WYO 789

Transportation in Fremont County, Wyoming
134